Germany–Morocco relations date back to the 19th century. The German Foreign Office describes Morocco as a "central partner of the European Union and Germany in North Africa," and Germany is an important trading partner for Morocco. In the past, however, relations have not always been entirely free of tension.

History 
As early as the early 16th century, the influential merchant families of the Welser and Fugger from the Holy Roman Empire Established branches in Morocco. A Roman-German contingent of troops took part in the Battle of Alcácer Quibir alongside Portugal in 1578, beating back an attempted Portuguese expansion into the country. After failed negotiations with the Hanseatic city Bremen, the Sultan of Morocco signed a trade treaty with Hanseatic rival Hamburg in 1802, and another one with Lübeck shortly thereafter.

In the 19th century, August Petermann (1854) and Gerhard Rohlfs (1873) visited the country and published reports that the German public familiar with the country. In 1872, the German Empire under Otto von Bismarck sent a diplomatic representative to Morocco, and in 1890 a German-Moroccan trade treaty was signed in Fez. The Empire's attempt to gain influence in Morocco led to conflict with France and the First (1904-1906) and Second Moroccan Crisis (1911). German warships were dispatched by Wilhelm II in the second crisis after French troops had occupied Fez and Rabat. On November 4, 1911, the Morocco-Congo Treaty was signed, in which the Empire received Neukamerun and renounced its claims in Morocco in return. Morocco became a French protectorate shortly thereafter.

After Second World War and Morocco's independence, relations were established in 1956 with the Federal Republic of Germany (FRG) were established. In 1963, a recruitment program for Moroccan guest workers was launched. In 1966, King Hassan II visited the FRG on a state visit. From 1972 until German reunification, Morocco also maintained official diplomatic relations with the German Democratic Republic (GDR).

In March 2021, diplomatic tensions arose between the two countries over the status of Moroccan-occupied Western Sahara after the United States unilaterally recognized Morocco's sovereignty over it in return for Morocco's recognition of Israel. Morocco accused Germany of having "repeatedly acted in a hostile manner against the higher interests of the Kingdom of Morocco." The country then recalled its ambassador from Berlin and imposed a ban on contact with the German Embassy and German organizations.

The following year, the two countries drew closer again. In August 2022, the German Foreign Minister Annalena Baerbock visited the seat of government Rabat and a German-Moroccan Joint Declaration was subsequently published, announcing an intensification of bilateral relations.

Economic relations 
Germany and Morocco have close economic relations, and a double taxation agreement (since 1974) and an investment protection agreement (since 2007) exist between the two countries. In November 2019, a German-Moroccan reform partnership was agreed. In 2021, Germany exported 2.2 billion euros worth of goods to Morocco and in return imported 1.6 billion euros worth of goods from the country. This made Germany Morocco's sixth-largest trading partner. Nearly 300 companies with German capital are present in Morocco, and nearly 6 percent of foreign tourists in the country came from Germany in 2019. The country has phosphate reserves of strategic importance.

Germany provides development assistance to Morocco, focusing on sustainable economic development and employment, renewable energy, and water management. In 2020, Germany made pledges of 1.2 billion euros and provided emergency assistance in the context of the COVID-19 pandemic Emergency aid.

Culture and education 
The Deutsch-Marokkanische Gesellschaft e.V., based in Dortmund, is dedicated to promoting common cultural relations. The Friedrich Ebert Foundation, the Konrad Adenauer Foundation, the Friedrich Naumann Foundation, the Hanns Seidel Foundation and the Heinrich Böll Foundation have offices in Morocco. Two Goethe-Instituts exist in Casablanca and Rabat. The Deutsche Akademische Austauschdienst has a presence in Morocco and there are over 60 university partnerships between the two countries.

Migration 

About 140,000 people of Moroccan descent live in Germany, most of them in major cities such as Berlin, Düsseldorf or Frankfurt am Main. The Central Council of Moroccans in Germany, based in Frankfurt am Main, acts as a lobby for the interests of the Moroccan community. Well-known German Moroccans include rapper Farid Bang, the singers Nadja Benaissa and Namika, and football players Adil Chihi, Karim Bellarabi, Mimoun Azaouagh, Manuel Schmiedebach, and Mohamed Amsif.

Diplomatic locations 

 Germany has an Embassy in Rabat.
 Morocco has a Embassy in Berlin and consulates-general in Düsseldorf and Frankfurt am Main.

See also
First Moroccan Crisis
Second Moroccan Crisis

References

External links 

 Information from the German Foreign Office on relations with Morocco

 
Morocco
Bilateral relations of Morocco